Raj Panjabi is an American  physician, social entrepreneur, professor and United States government official. Panjabi currently serves as senior director for global health security and biodefense on the United States National Security Council. Previously, Panjabi served as the 3rd U.S. Global Malaria Coordinator to lead the U.S. President's Malaria Initiative from February 2021 to February 2022. Panjabi was the first Asian American and first person born in Africa, where malaria remains endemic, to serve in the role. The U.S. President's Malaria Initiative, led by the U.S. Agency for International Development and co-implemented with the U.S. Centers for Disease Control and Prevention, has invested $8 billion to end malaria, helping save over 10.6 million lives and prevent over 1.7 billion cases globally.

Dr. Panjabi was named as one of the TIME 100 Most Influential People in the World in 2016, one of TIME's 50 Most Influential People in Health Care in 2018, received the 2017 TED Prize, and was listed as one of the World's 50 Greatest Leaders by Fortune in 2015 and in 2017.

Panjabi is the co-founder and former CEO of Last Mile Health and has served as Assistant Professor of Medicine at Harvard Medical School and Brigham and Women's Hospital, visiting faculty at Harvard's Kennedy School of Government, and Advisor to former President Ellen Johnson Sirleaf, Co-Chair (with former Prime Minister Helen Clark) of the Independent Panel for Pandemic Preparedness and Response. The Independent Panel was charged with publishing a landmark independent, impartial and comprehensive review of the global COVID-19 response and recommendations to prevent the next pandemic.

Early life and education 

Panjabi's grandparents were refugees from Sindh Province following the British Partition of India and Pakistan in 1947, resettling in Mumbai and Indore in India. A generation later, Panjabi's parents migrated to West Africa, where Panjabi was born and raised in Monrovia, Liberia. After civil war broke out in Liberia in 1989, Panjabi, at age nine, and his family fled on a rescue cargo plane to Sierra Leone and eventually sought asylum in the United States, resettling initially with a host family in High Point, North Carolina.

Panjabi graduated with bachelor and medical degrees from the University of North Carolina School at Chapel Hill and received a Masters of Public Health in epidemiology from the Johns Hopkins Bloomberg School of Public Health. He was a Clinical Fellow at Harvard Medical School, and trained in internal medicine and primary care at the Massachusetts General Hospital.

In the United States, Panjabi trained and worked as a clinical provider in community health systems in rural Alaska, North Carolina and Massachusetts.

Work

Last Mile Health 

Panjabi is the co-founder and former CEO of Last Mile Health, a global organization that supports frontline health workers and leaders around the world to strengthen rural and community health systems. He co-founded this organisation in 2007 with a small team of Liberian civil war survivors and American health workers and $6,000 he had received as a wedding gift.

Following the 2013-16 West Africa Ebola epidemic, Last Mile Health partnered with the Government of Liberia and other organizations to design and scale a National Community Health Assistant Program, which has trained and equipped thousands of community health workers, nurses, physician assistants, and midwives serving 80% of the rural population. The workers in this program carry out nearly 1/3 of all confirmed malaria diagnoses in the country, have identified over 4,000 potential epidemic events, have done over 3 million home visits, treated and referred over 1 million sick children, improved skill birth attendance, and increased the rate of children receiving medical care by over 50% in Liberia's most remote communities.

Through service, research and advocacy initiatives, Last Mile Health supports frontline health workers and leaders around the world to strengthen the quality of their community health systems, with a focus on multiple countries across west, east and southern Africa.

In 2017, Panjabi and Last Mile Health received the $1 million TED Prize to launch a global training platform called the Community Health Academy. In collaboration with several partners and governments, the Academy has launched online and mobile courses for frontline health leaders and providers working to strengthen community-based primary health care. The Academy's health systems leadership and clinical courses have enrolled over 50,000 current and future healthcare leaders, community health workers, nurses, midwives and frontline clinical providers, and other learners from nearly 200 countries, including the United States, India, Nigeria, Brazil, Canada, Indonesia, United Kingdom, Philippines and Pakistan.

Pandemic response 

Panjabi has led key efforts in response to 2013-16 Ebola epidemic in West Africa and the COVID-19 pandemic. Panjabi and the Last Mile Health team played a significant role in the 2013-16 West Africa Ebola epidemic, helping train over a thousand frontline and community health workers, mobilize hundreds of tons of personal protective equipment and support the Government of Liberia to organize and lead its National Ebola Operations Center. Panjabi delivered testimony at the US Senate Foreign Relations Subcommittee on Africa and Global Health Policy session, "A Progress Report of the West Africa Ebola Epidemic", arguing investments in rural community health workers can help make health systems responsive to Ebola and future epidemics. Panjabi served as health advisor to the Africa Union Africa Against Ebola Trust. He and Last Mile Health received Clinton Global Citizen Award, along with a coalition, for leadership in response to the 2013-16 West Africa Ebola epidemic.

In response to COVID-19, Panjabi and Last Mile Health has supported the Africa Centers for Disease Control and Prevention as well as national governments, including Liberia, Malawi, Uganda, and Ethiopia to train  frontline health workers to respond to COVID-19. He serves as technical advisor to former President Ellen Johnson Sirleaf in her role as Co-Chair of the WHO Independent Panel for Pandemic Preparedness and Response. Panjabi has worked as a physician at the Massachusetts General Hospital and Chelsea Community Health Center in Chelsea, Massachusetts, the COVID-19 epicenter in Massachusetts, where he has cared for patients with COVID and urgent care needs. He has served as co-chair of the COVID Response Fund at Echoing Green, a venture philanthropy investing in social entrepreneurs addressing the most pressing social challenges facing marginalized communities across America.

Research 
Panjabi has authored or co-authored over 50 publications.  He has chaired the Community Health Worker Exemplars in Global Health study with Gates Ventures (Private Office of Bill Gates) and the Gates Foundation, investigating lessons learned from exemplar community health systems in Brazil, Bangladesh, Ethiopia and Liberia. His and Last Mile Health's work on community and rural health care delivery has been published in The Lancet, the Journal of the American Medical Association, PLoS Medicine, the Bulletin of the World Health Organization, and the Journal of Global Health.

Panjabi was a co-author of the report Strengthening Primary Health Care through Community Health Workers: Investment Case and Financing Recommendations. The report found that extending the reach of the primary health care system by investing in community health worker programs can deliver a high economic return—up to 10:1—and calls on government leaders, international financiers, donors, and the global health community broadly to take specific actions to support the financing and scale up of community health worker programs across sub-Saharan Africa.

Speaking 

In 2017, Panjabi delivered a TED Talk entitled, "No One Should Die Because They Live Too Far From a Doctor." Panjabi's TED Talk has been viewed over one million times and was selected as a Top 10 TED Talk of 2017, alongside TED Talks from Pope Francis and Elon Musk. He gave additional TED talks in 2018 and 2019 on the power of investing in community and frontline health workers. Panjabi spoke on a panel hosted by The Elders in celebration of Nelson Mandela's 100th birthday in South Africa, with Former Irish President, Mary Robinson, and Former Liberian President, Ellen Johnson Sirleaf. Panjabi spoke at the TIME 100 Health Summit on Closing the Healthcare Gap. Panjabi highlighted the role of investing in rural community health workers at the TIME-Fortune Global Forum hosted by Pope Francis in 2016.

Panjabi delivered the commencement address at the graduation of Harvard Medical School in 2015, titled "The Power of Selfless Acts". He has delivered medical grand rounds at Harvard-teaching hospitals including Boston Children's Hospital, Massachusetts General Hospital, and Brigham & Women's Hospital, and gave a keynote address at the Institute for Healthcare Improvement's 2019 National Forum.

Board service and affiliation 

Panjabi is a Gavi Champion, member of the International Advisory Group for Frontlines First at the Global Financing Facility of the World Bank Group, advisor to the Community Health Roadmap, and a member of the Community Health Worker Hub at the World Health Organization [WHO], where he served on the External Review Group for the WHO's guidelines on health policy and system support to optimize community health worker programs. Panjabi has served as advisor to the World Health Organization's Ambassador for Health Workforce.

In his personal capacity, Panjabi serves on the boards of Last Mile Health, the Skoll Foundation, Echoing Green, and the Ellen Johnson Sirleaf Presidential Foundation. He previously  served on the board of Doctors for America.

Awards

Panjabi was named one of the World's 50 Greatest Leaders by Fortune in 2015 and 2017, listed as one of the 100 Most Influential People in the World by TIME in 2016 with a tribute from President Bill Clinton, one of TIME's 50 Most Influential People in Health Care in 2018, and received the 2017 TED Prize. He was recognized by Bill Gates in his "Heroes in the Field" series. Panjabi is a recognized social entrepreneur, receiving an Echoing Green Fellowship in 2011, a Draper Richards Kaplan Foundation Fellowship in 2013, the Skoll Award for Social Entrepreneurship and Schwab Social Entrepreneur of the Year from the World Economic Forum in 2017. In 2015, Panjabi accepted the Clinton Global Citizen Award on behalf of Last Mile Health and numerous organizations for "their leadership and collective response to the Ebola outbreak in West Africa and their continued effort to improve the health and well-being of the affected communities." In 2017,  President Ellen Johnson Sirleaf and the Government of Liberia recognized Panjabi with one of Liberia's highest civilian honors: Distinction of Knight Commander in the Most Venerable Order of the Pioneers of the Republic of Liberia.

References

External links
 
 https://www.forbes.com/sites/kerryadolan/2016/08/12/how-liberia-is-working-to-deliver-healthcare-to-more-than-a-quarter-of-its-population/#12c2812b2adf
 https://hms.harvard.edu/news/power-selflessness
 http://www.foreign.senate.gov/imo/media/doc/040716_Panjabi_Testimony.pdf
 http://fortune.com/2016/12/06/brainstorm-health-12-06-intro/
 http://www.huffingtonpost.com/jeffrey-walker/new-report-shows-that-inv_b_7829892.html
 
 http://www.healthenvoy.org/new-report-highlights-benefits-from-investments-in-chw-programs/

1981 births
Living people
Harvard Medical School staff
People from Monrovia
21st-century American physicians
People from High Point, North Carolina
University of North Carolina School of Medicine alumni
Liberian emigrants to the United States
American politicians of Indian descent
American politicians of Liberian descent
American people of Indian descent in health professions
Johns Hopkins Bloomberg School of Public Health alumni
American chief executives